"Everybody Jam!" is a song by Scatman John, released as a single from the album of the same name. It is a tribute to the music of Louis Armstrong with samples of his voice edited into the track as if in conversation with the Scatman. Also included is a trumpet solo sampled from Armstrong’s version of Skokiaan. The song charted at number-one in the Czech Republic and number 46 in Germany.

Critical reception
Larry Flick from Billboard described the song as a "amusing and charming dance ditty". He added that "This time, John's flashy vocal skills are put to the test over a galloping disco groove that is laced with big-band horns and swaggering male background chants."

Music video
A music video was produced to promote the single, directed by Doro. The video was filmed on location in New Orleans and cost around $500,000 US. According to the Scatman, "the day we shot the video was a day beyond all boundaries of time and space. Full of magic. All of the images together created the perfect atmosphere for showing the heart and soul of Louis Armstrong's roots". In the video Scatman, walking across a parking lot, sees the ghost of Louis Armstrong on the side of a building and the pair begin to duet. The bulk of the video takes place in a Louisiana street parade with Scatman and Louis riding along behind a marching band in a cadillac. Several children dressed up like Scatman are seen in the procession whilst onlookers wave Scatman and Louis flags. The video ends with Scatman looking up at Louis in the parking lot where it started. An alternate version of the music video was released with some parts of the video replaced with different scenes. 

"Everybody Jam!" was later published on Scatman John's official YouTube channel in August 2014. The video has amassed more than 2.8 million views as of July 2022.

Single track listing

CD
"Everybody Jam!" [Single Jam] (3:29) 
"Everybody Jam!" [Maxi Jam] (5:21)
"Everybody Jam!" [Club Jam] (5:40)
"Scatmusic" (3:55)

12"
"Everybody Jam!" [DJ Errik's Commercial Charleston Club Mix] (5:42)
"Everybody Jam!" [DJ Errik's Nothing Like a Poison Jam Mix] (5:50)

Charts

References

Scatman John songs
1996 singles
Cultural depictions of Louis Armstrong
1996 songs
Number-one singles in the Czech Republic
Jazz rap songs
Electro swing songs